Jump Force is a Japanese crossover fighting game developed by Spike Chunsoft and published by Bandai Namco Entertainment featuring characters from various manga series featured in Shueisha's Weekly Shōnen Jump anthology in celebration of the magazine's 50th anniversary. The game was released on February 14, 2019 in Japan for PlayStation 4 and Xbox One, and the following day worldwide in addition to Windows. A Nintendo Switch port was released worldwide on August 28, 2020. The game received mixed reviews from critics.

Premise
When the real world collides with many of the Shōnen Jump universes, humanity is invaded by the "Venoms", an army of mind-controlled villains led by Kane and Galena. In order to fight back, many heroes are recruited to join the "Jump Force" under the leadership of Director Glover and his A.I. partner Navigator. But a suspicious figure is using both the Jump Force and the Venoms as an attempt to gain a mysterious artifact and merge all worlds into one.

Plot
Frieza attacks New York City with an army of Venoms, being confronted by Son Goku; however, a stray laser blast from Frieza fatally wounds a civilian in the war zone. Trunks revives the civilian with a cybernetic device called an umbras cube, giving them the potential to be a hero like them. Frieza withdraws, allowing Goku and Trunks to take the civilian back to their HQ, where they are greeted by Director Glover. Glover explains that the manga worlds from "Jump" have somehow begun merging with the real world and using their own umbras cubes to turn evil-hearted humans into Venoms, forcing him to create the Jump Force to quell the threat; the organization consists of heroes from the "Jump" worlds, along with other people saved through the cubes.

The group is divided into Alpha, Beta and Gamma teams; Son Goku leads Alpha (along with Piccolo, Zoro and Gaara) to fight off the invading Venoms, Luffy leads Beta (along with Boa Hancock, Sanji, Boruto and later Vegeta) to reclaim the territory from the Venoms, while Naruto leads Gamma (along with Kakashi, Sasuke, Trunks and Sabo) for stealthy reconnaissance. The new hero, who serves as the game's player character, is asked to join one of the divisions to help repel the invasion.  Light Yagami, whose Death Note lost its powers by the merging of worlds has also joined, secretly intent on restoring it.

The Jump Force discover other heroes being mind-controlled by umbras cubes charged with evil energy. They free the heroes and recruit them, taking the cubes for inspection. Duplicates of the Jump villains made of the dark umbras cubes also appear, along with the real ones, adding to the confusion.

After an amnesiac girl named Angela is rescued, several members of the Jump Force suddenly become possessed by evil auras during missions, leading them to suspect a traitor is among them. While Sanji is initially blamed, the culprit is revealed to be Angela, who is a disguise for the evil Galena. She steals the collected umbras cubes and gives them to her master Kane, a man seeking to wipe out humanity in revenge for the deaths of his family. The player pursues and defeats Kane, but Glover reveals himself as Prometheus, the true mastermind behind the merging of the worlds and Galena's true master, having used Kane to sow chaos across the worlds. Having outlived his usefulness, Galena seemingly kills Kane and proceeds to stall the heroes to allow Prometheus to continue his plans. The heroes defeat Galena, only for Prometheus to absorb her afterward.

The heroes confront Prometheus, who reveals himself to be a "keyman" charged with showing the real world the stories of "Jump", but grew tired of humanity's vices and attempts to merge the real and the Jump worlds together in order to guide humanity in the right direction. He steals the player's cube for its good energy, planning to use it to balance the evil energy he collected from the villains to become a god. The villains form a temporary truce with the heroes, while a still-alive Kane uses the last of his strength to give his cube to the player and Goku empowers them further with the energy from all of the Jump Force, allowing them to destroy Prometheus.

However, Prometheus's death does not separate the realities, leaving Earth still under threat from the Jump villains. At Trunks' suggestion, the player character becomes the new Jump Force director and continues to protect humanity. Meanwhile, Light finds an umbras cube left behind by Prometheus, planning to use its dark energy to re-power his Death Note.

Gameplay
Jump Force is a 1-v-1 fighting game where the player controls a team of three characters from a selection of various manga series featured in the Weekly Shōnen Jump magazine. Players control one character at a time while the others are used as support, with players able to switch between them during battle. Combat functions similarly to the previous Jump fighting game, such as J-Stars Victory VS, Dragon Ball Xenoverse sub-series, Naruto: Ultimate Ninja Storm sub-series and One Piece: Burning Blood, with players moving around a 3D space and utilizing various combos and special moves to attack their opponents. The match ends when one team depletes the other's health bar.

Characters
The game's launch roster features 40 playable characters from 16 series, with 14 additional characters available as downloadable content via Character Passes and three added as part of a free update for a total of 57 characters. In addition, players are allowed to create their own unique playable character, customizing them with abilities, outfits and accessories earned through gameplay.

Playable characters

Black Clover
Asta
Bleach
Ichigo Kurosaki
Rukia Kuchiki
Renji Abarai
Sōsuke Aizen
Tōshirō Hitsugaya (DLC)
Grimmjow Jaegerjaquez (DLC)
Yoruichi Shihōin (DLC)
Boruto: Naruto Next Generations
Boruto Uzumaki
City Hunter
Ryo Saeba
Dragon Ball
Son Goku
Vegeta
Trunks
Piccolo
Frieza
Cell
Majin Buu (DLC)
Dragon Quest: The Adventure of Dai
Dai
Fist of the North Star
Kenshiro
Hunter × Hunter
Gon Freecss
Killua Zoldyck
Kurapika
Hisoka Morow
Biscuit Krueger (DLC)
Meruem (DLC)
JoJo's Bizarre Adventure
Jotaro Kujo
DIO
Giorno Giovanna (DLC)

My Hero Academia
Izuku Midoriya
All Might (DLC)
Katsuki Bakugo (DLC)
Shoto Todoroki (DLC)
Naruto
Naruto Uzumaki
Sasuke Uchiha
Kakashi Hatake
Gaara
Kaguya Ōtsutsuki
Madara Uchiha (DLC)
One Piece 
Monkey D. Luffy
Roronoa Zoro
Sanji
Sabo
Boa Hancock
Blackbeard
Trafalgar D. Water Law (DLC)
Rurouni Kenshin
Himura Kenshin
Shishio Makoto
Saint Seiya
Pegasus Seiya
Dragon Shiryū
Yu-Gi-Oh!
Yugi Muto/Yami Yugi
Seto Kaiba (DLC)
Yu Yu Hakusho
Yusuke Urameshi
Younger Toguro
 Hiei (DLC)
Original Jump Force characters

 
<ref
name="originalcharacters"/>

Non-playable characters

Death Note
Light Yagami
Ryuk

Original Jump Force characters

Development and release
Jump Force was developed by Spike Chunsoft and published by Bandai Namco. The game is using Unreal Engine 4, and was created in commemoration of the 50th anniversary of Weekly Shōnen Jump. Dragon Ball creator Akira Toriyama designed the original characters created for the game. Jump Force was announced at E3 2018 during Microsoft's press conference. It was released on February 14, 2019 for PlayStation 4 and Xbox One in Japan, and on February 15, 2019 in the west for the same platforms, as well as Windows. A Nintendo Switch port was announced in April 2020. The Switch version, titled Jump Force Deluxe Edition, includes the downloadable content from the first Character Pass and was released worldwide on August 28, 2020.

Discontinuation 
On November 10, 2021, Bandai Namco announced the discontinuation of the game. It was delisted from digital stores along with its downloadable content on February 8, 2022, and the shutdown of its online servers happened 10 months later on August 24, 2022.

Reception

The game received "mixed or average reviews" according to review aggregator Metacritic.

Sales 
In Japan, approximately 76,894 physical units for PS4 were sold during its launch week, becoming the top-selling game that week. As of 17 March 2019, the PS4 version has sold 190,214 physical units in Japan. The Nintendo Switch version sold 15,588 retail copies during its first week on sale in Japan, making it the seventh bestselling game of the week in the country.

In North America, the game debuted at number two on NPD's monthly sales chart for February 2019, behind only Anthem. Jump Force is North America's fourth best-selling game of 2019 (behind only Kingdom Hearts III, Anthem, and Resident Evil 2), and had the third highest launch month sales for a Bandai Namco game in the territory.

In Europe, Jump Force debuted at number four on the weekly UK charts, with the PS4 version accounting for 74% of launch sales. It debuted at number one on the weekly Italian charts, and at number three on the weekly Switzerland charts, behind the other two new releases of the week, Metro Exodus and Far Cry New Dawn.

Steam Spy estimates that the PC version sold between 50,000 and 100,000 units worldwide on the Steam platform, as of 23 March 2019. And between 200,000 and 500,000 units as of 22 December 2020.

Awards

References

External links
 Jump Force Japanese official website
 Jump Force North American official website
 Jump Force European official website

2019 video games
Bandai Namco games
Crossover fighting games
Bleach (manga) video games
Dragon Ball games
Fighting games
Inactive multiplayer online games
JoJo's Bizarre Adventure games
Multiplayer and single-player video games
Naruto video games
Nintendo Switch games
One Piece games
PlayStation 4 games
Saint Seiya video games
Spike Chunsoft video games
Science fiction video games
Superhero video games
Unreal Engine games
Video games developed in Japan
Video games about parallel universes
Video games with AI-versus-AI modes
Video games with downloadable content
Weekly Shōnen Jump (video game series)
Windows games
Works based on Square Enix video games
Products and services discontinued in 2022
Xbox One games
Yu-Gi-Oh! video games
YuYu Hakusho games
Video games with customizable avatars